The torr (symbol: Torr) is a unit of pressure based on an absolute scale, defined as exactly  of a standard atmosphere.  Thus one torr is exactly  (≈ ).

Historically, one torr was intended to be the same as one "millimeter of mercury", but subsequent redefinitions of the two units made them slightly different (by less than ).  The torr is not part of the International System of Units (SI). It is often combined with the metric prefix milli to name one millitorr (mTorr) or 0.001 Torr.

The unit was named after Evangelista Torricelli, an Italian physicist and mathematician who discovered the principle of the barometer in 1644.

Nomenclature and common errors
The unit name torr is written in lower case, while its symbol ("Torr") is always written with upper-case initial; including in combinations with prefixes and other unit symbols, as in "mTorr" (millitorr) or "Torr⋅L/s" (torr-litres per second). The symbol (uppercase) should be used with prefix symbols (thus, mTorr and millitorr are correct, but mtorr and milliTorr are not).

The torr is sometimes incorrectly denoted by the symbol "T", which is the SI symbol for the tesla, the unit measuring the strength of a magnetic field. Although frequently encountered, the alternative spelling "Tor" is incorrect.

History
Torricelli attracted considerable attention when he demonstrated the first mercury barometer to the general public. He is credited with giving the first modern explanation of atmospheric pressure. Scientists at the time were familiar with small fluctuations in height that occurred in barometers. When these fluctuations were explained as a manifestation of changes in atmospheric pressure, the science of meteorology was born.

Over time, 760 millimeters of mercury at 0 °C came to be regarded as the standard atmospheric pressure. In honour of Torricelli, the torr was defined as a unit of pressure equal to one millimeter of mercury at 0 °C. However, since the acceleration due to gravity – and thus the weight of a column of mercury – is a function of elevation and latitude (due to the rotation and non-sphericity of the Earth), this definition is imprecise and varies by location.

This yields a precise definition that is unambiguous and independent of measurements of the density of mercury or the acceleration due to gravity on Earth.

Manometric units of pressure

Manometric units are units such as millimeters of mercury or centimeters of water that depend on an assumed density of a fluid and an assumed acceleration due to gravity.  The use of these units is discouraged.  Nevertheless, manometric units are routinely used in medicine and physiology, and they continue to be used in areas as diverse as weather reporting and scuba diving.

Conversion factors

Therefore, 1 Torr is equal to  Pa. The decimal form of this fraction is an infinitely long, periodically repeating decimal (repetend length: 18).

The relationship between the torr and the millimeter of mercury is:

1 Torr =  mmHg
1 mmHg =  Torr

The difference between one millimeter of mercury and one torr, as well as between one atmosphere (101.325 kPa) and 760 mmHg, is less than one part in seven million (or less than ). This small difference is negligible for most applications outside metrology.

Other units of pressure include:

 The bar (symbol: bar), defined as 100 kPa exactly.
 The atmosphere (symbol: atm), defined as 101.325 kPa exactly.
 The torr (symbol: Torr), defined as  atm exactly.

These four pressure units are used in different settings.  For example, the bar is used in meteorology to report atmospheric pressures.  The torr is used in high-vacuum physics and engineering.

See also
 Atmosphere (unit)
 Centimetre of water
 Conversion of units
 Inch of mercury
 Outline of the metric system
 Pascal (unit)
 Pressure head
 Pressure

References

External links
NPL – pressure units

Non-SI metric units
Units of pressure
Mercury (element)